San Pablo de Loreto is a village, and the location of a leper colony in Peru. The village is located near Iquitos. The colony was constructed in 1925. In 1941, it became an agricultural colony in which the patients had to work the fields. In 1952, Che Guevara and Alberto Granado worked at the colony. The colony was home to around 600 people at the time. By 1957, the number of patients had increased to about 780. The colony was closed for admission from 1967 onwards, and a 1968 report by Dr Masayoshi Itoh described that 87% of the patients were in need of surgical treatment. The leprosium has since then closed, and the patients have been transferred to Iquitos.

See also
 The Motorcycle Diaries (book) or The Motorcycle Diaries (film)

References

Leper colonies
Medical and health organisations based in Peru
Populated places in the Loreto Region